Hancock High School is a public school located in Hancock, Michigan. Their current location in Hancock is at 501 Campus Drive.Their athletics teams are nicknamed the Bulldogs, who have a long-standing rivalry with their neighboring city of Houghton's teams, the Gremlins.

The Hancock Bulldogs were the state champions in boys' ice hockey in 1999 and 2016.

References

External links
 Hancock Public Schools

Public high schools in Michigan
Schools in Houghton County, Michigan